The 2020 African Volleyball Championship U19 was held in Abuja, Nigeria from 4 to 8 March 2021. The top two teams of the tournament qualified for the 2021 FIVB Volleyball Boys' U19 World Championship.

Nigeria finished the 4-team round-robin tournament on top of the standing to clinch their first title.

Qualification
9 CAVB under-19 national teams have registered to participate in the 2020 African Championship U19. But, Central African Republic, DR Congo, Egypt, Madagascar and Tunisia later withdrew.

 (Hosts)

Squads

Venue
 Abuja Sports Hall, Abuja, Nigeria

Pool standing procedure
 Number of matches won
 Match points
 Sets ratio
 Points ratio
 Result of the last match between the tied teams

Match won 3–0 or 3–1: 3 match points for the winner, 0 match points for the loser
Match won 3–2: 2 match points for the winner, 1 match point for the loser

Round robin

|}

|}

Final standing

References

External links
African Volleyball Confederation – official website

African Volleyball Championship U19
Volleyball Championship U19
2021 in Nigerian sport
International volleyball competitions hosted by Nigeria
African Volleyball